In geometric topology and differential topology, an (n + 1)-dimensional cobordism W between n-dimensional manifolds M and N is an h-cobordism (the h stands for homotopy equivalence) if the inclusion maps

 

are homotopy equivalences.

The h-cobordism theorem gives sufficient conditions for an h-cobordism to be trivial, i.e., to be C-isomorphic to the cylinder M × [0, 1]. Here C refers to any of the categories of smooth, piecewise linear, or topological manifolds.

The theorem was first proved by Stephen Smale for which he received the Fields Medal and is a fundamental result in the theory of high-dimensional manifolds. For a start, it almost immediately proves the generalized Poincaré conjecture.

Background
Before Smale proved this theorem, mathematicians became stuck while trying to understand manifolds of dimension 3 or 4, and assumed that the higher-dimensional cases were even harder. The h-cobordism theorem showed that (simply connected) manifolds of dimension at least 5 are much easier than those of dimension 3 or 4. The proof of the theorem depends on the "Whitney trick" of Hassler Whitney, which geometrically untangles homologically-tangled spheres of complementary dimension in a manifold of dimension >4. An informal reason why manifolds of dimension 3 or 4 are unusually hard is that the trick fails to work in lower dimensions, which have no room for entanglement.

Precise statement of the h-cobordism theorem

Let n be at least 5 and let W be a compact (n + 1)-dimensional h-cobordism between M and N in the category C=Diff, PL, or Top such that W, M and N are simply connected, then W is C-isomorphic to M × [0, 1]. The isomorphism can be chosen to be the identity on M × {0}.

This means that the homotopy equivalence between M and N (or, between M × [0, 1], W and N × [0, 1]) is homotopic to a C-isomorphism.

Lower dimensional versions
For n = 4, the h-cobordism theorem is true topologically (proved by Michael Freedman using a 4-dimensional Whitney trick) but is false PL and smoothly (as shown by Simon Donaldson).

For n = 3, the h-cobordism theorem for smooth manifolds has not been proved and, due to the 3-dimensional Poincaré conjecture, is equivalent to the hard open question of whether the 4-sphere has non-standard smooth structures.

For n = 2, the h-cobordism theorem is equivalent to the Poincaré conjecture stated by Poincaré in 1904 (one of the Millennium Problems) and was proved by Grigori Perelman in a series of three papers in 2002 and 2003, where he follows Richard S. Hamilton's program using Ricci flow.

For n = 1, the h-cobordism theorem is vacuously true, since there is no closed simply-connected 1-dimensional manifold.

For n = 0, the h-cobordism theorem is trivially true: the interval is the only connected cobordism between connected 0-manifolds.

A proof sketch
The goal of the proof is to find a handle decomposition with no handles at all so that integrating the non-zero gradient vector field of f gives the desired diffeomorphism to the trivial cobordism.

This is achieved through a series of techniques.

1) Handle rearrangement

First, we want to rearrange all handles by order so that lower order handles are attached first. The question is thus when can we slide an i-handle off of a j-handle? This can be done by a radial isotopy so long as the i attaching sphere and the j belt sphere do not intersect.

2) Handle cancellation

Next, we want to "cancel" handles. The idea is that attaching a k-handle  might create a hole that can be filled in by attaching a (k + 1)-handle . This would imply that  and so the  entry in the matrix of  would be . However, when is this condition sufficient? That is, when can we geometrically cancel handles if this condition is true? The answer lies in carefully analyzing when the manifold remains simply-connected after removing the attaching and belt spheres in question, and finding an embedded disk using the Whitney trick. This analysis leads to the requirement that n must be at least 5. Moreover, during the proof one requires that the cobordism has no 0-,1-,n-, or (n + 1)-handles which is obtained by the next technique.

3) Handle trading

The idea of handle trading is to create a cancelling pair of (k + 1)- and (k + 2)-handles so that a given k-handle cancels with the (k + 1)-handle leaving behind the (k + 2)-handle. This group is trivial since W is an h-cobordism. Thus, there is a disk  which we can fatten to a cancelling pair as desired, so long as we can embed this disk into the boundary of W. This embedding exists if . Since we are assuming n is at least 5 this means that k is either 0 or 1. Finally, by considering the negative of the given Morse function, −f, we can turn the handle decomposition upside down and also remove the n- and (n + 1)-handles as desired.

4) Handle sliding

Finally, we want to make sure that doing row and column operations on  corresponds to a geometric operation.

The proof of the theorem now follows: the handle chain complex is exact since . Then , which is an integer matrix, restricts to an invertible morphism which can thus be diagonalized via elementary row operations (handle sliding) and must have only  on the diagonal because it is invertible. Thus, all handles are paired with a single other cancelling handle yielding a decomposition with no handles.

The s-cobordism theorem 
If the assumption that M and N are simply connected is dropped, h-cobordisms need not be cylinders; the obstruction is exactly the Whitehead torsion τ (W, M) of the inclusion .

Precisely, the s-cobordism theorem (the s stands for simple-homotopy equivalence), proved independently by Barry Mazur, John Stallings, and Dennis Barden, states (assumptions as above but where M and N need not be simply connected):
 An h-cobordism is a cylinder if and only if Whitehead torsion τ (W, M) vanishes.
The torsion vanishes if and only if the inclusion  is not just a homotopy equivalence, but a simple homotopy equivalence.

Note that one need not assume that the other inclusion  is also a simple homotopy equivalence—that follows from the theorem.

Categorically, h-cobordisms form a groupoid.

Then a finer statement of the s-cobordism theorem is that the isomorphism classes of this groupoid (up to C-isomorphism of h-cobordisms) are torsors for the respective Whitehead groups Wh(π), where

See also 
 Semi-s-cobordism

Notes

References
  (This does the theorem for topological 4-manifolds.)
Milnor, John, Lectures on the h-cobordism theorem, notes by L. Siebenmann and J. Sondow, Princeton University Press, Princeton, NJ, 1965.  v+116 pp.  This gives the proof for smooth manifolds.
Rourke, Colin Patrick; Sanderson, Brian Joseph, Introduction to piecewise-linear topology,  Springer Study Edition, Springer-Verlag, Berlin-New York, 1982.  . This proves the theorem for PL manifolds.
S. Smale,   "On the structure of manifolds"  Amer. J. Math., 84  (1962)  pp. 387–399

Differential topology
Surgery theory